Kovan may refer to:

Places
 Kovan, Singapore, a suburb and part of Hougang, Singapore
 Kovan MRT station, a station of the Mass Rapid Transit in Hougang, Singapore
 Kovan, West Virginia, US
 Kováň, a village and municipality in the Czech Republic

Other uses
 Kovan (singer), Tamil folk singer and activist
 Kovan double murders, a 2013 double murder in Kovan, Singapore